Parallels of Infinite Torture is the fourth studio album by American death metal band Disgorge.

Track listing
 "Revealed in Obscurity" — 5:13
 "Enthroned Abominations" — 4:05
 "Atonement" — 2:57
 "Abhorrent Desecration of Thee Iniquity" — 4:15
 "Forgotten Scriptures" — 2:01
 "Descending upon Convulsive Devourment" — 4:38
 "Condemned to Sufferance" — 4:57
 "Parallels of Infinite Torture" — 5:03
 "Asphyxiation of Thee Oppressed" — 5:42
 "Ominous Sigils of Ungodly Ruin" — 4:39

Unique Leader Records albums
2005 albums
Disgorge (American band) albums